Highsnobiety is a global fashion and lifestyle media brand founded in 2005 by David Fischer. It was bought by German e-commerce giant Zalando in 2022. 
Highsnobiety is headquartered in Berlin and has offices in Amsterdam, London, Milan, New York, Los Angeles and Sydney.

Highsnobiety has a digital-first publishing approach, with a multichannel presence. The print magazine first launched in 2010, with quarterly issues published globally.

Highsnobiety Shop, a multi-brand online fashion and lifestyle retailer, was launched in 2019. Highsnobiety launched their apparel collection in 2021.

Since 2018, the brand publishes regular research papers in the fields of luxury and young consumer trends in collaboration with Boston Consulting Group.

In 2021, Highsnobiety launched Gate Zero, a travel retail concept with locations in Zurich International Airport. In 2022, travel retail company Gebr. Heinemann announced a joint venture to expand the concept, beginning with a location at Copenhagen International Airport.

Awards and honors
 2022 D&AD Wood Pencil Award for Advertising, Design, Craft, Culture and Impact
 2022 Webby Award for Advertising, Media & PR Fashion, Beauty & Lifestyle
 2022 Webby Award for Video Fashion & Lifestyle (Branded)
 2018 Digiday Award for Best In-House Content/Brand Studio
 2017 Webby Award for Cultural Blog/Website
 2017 BoF 500, Business of Fashion

References

External links

German news websites
Fashion websites
Sneaker culture